"Where I'm From" is the lead single by American former rapper Passion taken from her only studio album, Baller's Lady.

Background
The song was produced by Studio Ton and written by Passion Broussard, Kevin Irving, and Valerie Webb.

In popular culture
"Where I'm From" was used as a song on the soundtrack for the 1996 film Bulletproof.

Chart positions

References

American hip hop songs
American contemporary R&B songs
1996 songs
1996 debut singles
MCA Records singles